George Littlefield may refer to:

 George H. Littlefield (1842–1919), US Medal of Honor winner
 George W. Littlefield (1842–1920), Regent of the University of Texas